Omar Jerome Beckles (born 25 October 1991) is a professional footballer who plays as a defender for Leyton Orient. Born in England, he represents the Grenada national team. He is currently the chair of the Professional Footballers' Association.

Career

Spain
Born in Leytonstone, England, Beckles began his career at Millwall before joining Jerez Industrial in 2010. Beckles made his Jerez Industrial debut on 6 February 2011 against Córdoba CF B, which saw Jerez Industrial lose 3–1. He went on to make thirteen appearances for Jerez Industrial. However, Glenn Hoddle Academy terminated its agreement with Jerez Industrial in March 2011, leading Beckles to leave the club, although he continued to play for the side for the remainder of the season.

Non-League football
After returning to his homeland, Beckles joined Boreham Wood in November 2011, where he first appeared as unused substitute, in a 1–1 draw against Basingstoke Town on 24 November 2011. It was not until on 17 December 2011 when he made his debut, coming on as a second-half substitute for Charlie O'Loughlin, in a 2–1 win over Eastleigh. Beckles soon became a first team regular at Boreham Wood and went on to make nineteen appearances for the side.

In the summer transfer window of 2012, Beckles joined Kettering Town after leaving Boreham Wood. However, after making just six appearances for The Poppies, Beckles was forced to find a new club, citing the club's financial problems as the reason for his departure.

After leaving Kettering Town, Beckles re–joined Boreham Wood on 16 November 2012 and re–debuted for the club the next day, in a 1–1 draw against Dover Athletic. However, Beckles went on to make six appearances before leaving for Billericay Town in February 2013. He made his Billericay Town debut on 23 February 2013, in a 3–2 loss against Bromley. He went on to make thirteen appearances for the club.

On 5 July 2013, Beckles joined Histon. Beckles made a good start to his Histon debut when he scored on 17 August 2013, in a 3–1 win over Colwyn Bay. Beckles soon became a first team regular at Histon, making thirty-two appearances and scoring once in all competitions, but joined Margate and AFC Hornchurch.

In November 2014, Beckles was on the move again when he joined St Albans City and made his St Albans City debut on 15 November 2014, making his first start and playing the whole game, in a 1–0 win over Basingstoke Town. Playing in a central defensive midfielder role, it wasn't until on 4 January 2015 when he scored his first goal for the club, in a 2–1 win over Gosport Borough. Beckles scored his second goal for the side on 21 February 2015, in a 2–1 loss against Whitehawk. At the end of the 2014–15 season, he went on to make twenty-one appearances and scoring once. For his performance, Beckles agreed a new contract with the club to play for them next season.

Aldershot Town
In July 2015, Beckles signed for Aldershot Town, signing a one-year contract. Upon joining the club, he was given a number fourteen shirt.

Beckles made his Aldershot Town debut, in the opening game of the season, where he played the whole game, in a 2–1 loss against Gateshead. From that moment on, Beckles became a first team regular at the club, forming a centre-back partnership with Jack Saville for the most of the season. After making his debut, Beckles cemented his place in the side, which resulted in him making the Team of the Week. after a great performance against Kidderminster Harriers on 30 January 2016.  It wasn't until on 28 March 2016, though, when Beckles scored his first goal of the club in a 2–1 win over Braintree Town. At the end of the 2015–16 season, Beckles made 48 appearances (45 of which were in the league) and scored once in all competitions.

Beckles was awarded the Supporters Player of the Year. In addition, Beckles was also offered a new contract by the club. However, on 9 June 2016, Beckles left the club after not responding to a new contract by Aldershot Town.

Accrington Stanley
In June 2016, he signed for League Two side Accrington Stanley, signing a one-year contract. Upon joining the club, Beckles was given a number five shirt.

Beckles made his debut against Doncaster Rovers on the opening day of the season, which saw Accrington Stanley win 3–2. He then made provided two assists in two matches on 24 September 2016 and 27 September 2016 against Colchester United and Mansfield Town. In the club's second meeting against Mansfield Town of the season on 14 February 2017, he scored his first goal for the club, in a 4–4 draw. However, in the next match against Colchester United on 18 February 2017, Beckles received a straight red card in a 2–1 win. Following the match, Beckles served a three match suspension, after manager John Coleman decided against appealing, citing "a waste of time". After returning from suspension, Beckles scored again on 18 March 2017, in a 1–1 draw against Yeovil Town. However, in a 4–1 loss against Luton Town on 29 April 2017, Beckles scored an own goal following "a comedy of errors to give Luton a second when Beckles headed back to Rodak and it looped over the keeper and into the net four minutes into the second half." In total, Beckles made 50 appearances in all competitions, and scored three times - all in his first season at Accrington.

Shrewsbury Town
Beckles joined League One side Shrewsbury Town for an undisclosed fee in August 2017, signing a three-year deal. Initially used mostly as a substitute or rotation player, he broke into the first-team on a regular basis playing as a left-back following a long-term injury to Junior Brown, and scored his first goal for the club in a 2−1 away victory at Bristol Rovers on 3 February 2018.

After making 80 league appearances and scoring six league goals, Beckles left the club on 13 August 2020 after deciding to not renew his contract.

Crewe Alexandra
On 4 September 2020, Crewe Alexandra announced Beckles had agreed a one year deal with a 12-month option. He made his Crewe debut in a 3–2 victory at Bolton Wanderers in an EFL Trophy group game on 8 September 2020. On 3 October 2020, Beckles caused Crewe's League One game at Oxford United to be postponed after he reported a positive diagnosis of COVID-19 disease on the morning of the match. He scored his first goal for Crewe, opening the scoring in a 2-0 win over former club Accrington Stanley, at Gresty Road on 23 February 2021. On 13 May 2021, Crewe announced that it had offered Beckles a new contract.

Leyton Orient
On 15 June 2021, Beckles was announced to have agreed to join hometown club Leyton Orient, agreeing to sign a two-year deal.

International career
In August 2019, Beckles was called up for the first time to play for Grenada, alongside his Shrewsbury teammate Aaron Pierre. He made his debut for The Spice Boys on 5 September, a 2–1 win over Saint Kitts and Nevis.

Career statistics

Honours
Shrewsbury Town
EFL Trophy runner-up: 2017–18

Personal life
Beckles was born in Leytonstone, London. He is of Grenadian descent.

He is a devout Christian.

His father, Linton, was in a R&B and soul band named Central Line. Linton died from complications of pneumonia at age 59. Beckles stated his father's death put a huge effect on him and his family and was a huge influence on his life.

Growing up in Walthamstow, Beckles grew up supporting Arsenal.

References

External links

1991 births
Living people
Footballers from Leytonstone
English footballers
English sportspeople of Grenadian descent
People with acquired Grenadian citizenship
Grenadian footballers
Grenada international footballers
Expatriate footballers in Spain
English expatriate sportspeople in Spain
Grenadian expatriate sportspeople
Association football defenders
Millwall F.C. players
Jerez Industrial CF players
Boreham Wood F.C. players
Kettering Town F.C. players
Billericay Town F.C. players
Histon F.C. players
Margate F.C. players
Hornchurch F.C. players
St Albans City F.C. players
Aldershot F.C. players
Accrington Stanley F.C. players
Shrewsbury Town F.C. players
Crewe Alexandra F.C. players
English Football League players
National League (English football) players
Isthmian League players
Southern Football League players
2021 CONCACAF Gold Cup players